This is a list of cars used in various Formula Renault classes raced in the World Series by Renault and its predecessor Formula Renault and Formula France.

References

Formularenault
Formula Renault